Hunnington railway station was a railway station in the village of Hunnington, near Halesowen, England, on the Great Western Railway & Midland Railway's Joint Halesowen Railway line from Old Hill to Longbridge. The station had only a single platform but had its own sidings, which served the now closed Blue Bird Toffee factory. Advertised public passenger services were withdrawn in 1919 but workmen's trains continued until 1958.

Unlike most of the other former stations and infrastructure of the Halesowen Railway, Hunnington station building still remains as a private residence.

References

Further reading

Disused railway stations in Worcestershire
Railway stations in Great Britain opened in 1883
Railway stations in Great Britain closed in 1958
Former Midland Railway stations
Former Great Western Railway stations